La Fattoria 3 is the third edition of The farm is one that has proved most successful and has had more time, in fact, held from February 15 to May 20, 2006 on Channel 5, for 13 weeks. Barbara D'Urso confirmed to run, now an expert presenter of reality, while on location in Morocco has sent the actor Francesco Salvi. The program ran for a total of 14 episodes plus a finale celebration. Originally broadcast on Wednesday evening, in subsequent episodes have found a permanent place on Saturday evening [1] (with a midweek episode aired Wednesday, May 3). The theme of the program was "Caravan Petrol" by Renato Carosone, which was changed the "Allah Allah Allah" in "Pasha Pasha Pasha" to make the song more consistent with the ironic style of delivery, focusing on the figure of the pasha (leader).

Contestants
Rosario Rannisi – TV Collaborator.
Clemente Pernarella – Actor.
Justine Mattera – Showgirl & Actress.
Angela Cavagna – Showgirl.
Katia Ricciarelli – Soprano.
Selvaggia Lucarelli – TV Host.
Francesco Arca – Ex-Uomini e Donne Contestant.
Jennipher Rodriguez – Model & Showgirl.
Alessia Fabiani – Showgirl
Ivano Michetti e Silvano Michetti de I cugini di campagna – Group of Singers.
Aldo Montano – Fencer.
Leopoldo Mastelloni – Actor.
Pamela Petrarolo – Showgirl & Singer.
Marcus Schenkenberg – Supermodel.
Randi Ingerman – Model & Actress.
Alvaro Vitali – Actor.
Natalie Kriz – Model & Showgirl.

Nominations

The Farm (franchise)